The Gold Cure is a 1925 British silent comedy film directed by W. P. Kellino and starring Queenie Thomas, Gladys Hamer and Jameson Thomas. It was made by Stoll Pictures at Cricklewood Studios.

Cast
 Queenie Thomas as Betty Van Allen
 Gladys Hamer as Bella Box
 Jameson Thomas as Lansing Carter
 Eric Bransby Williams as Lord Dinacre
 Albert E. Raynor as Mr. Van Allen
 Moore Marriott as Janbois
 Judd Green as Mr. Box
 Leal Douglas as Lady Dunacre
 Johnny Butt as Albert Horsey
 Jefferson Gore as Dennis O'Shamus
 Nell Emerald as Nora Flanegan
 Dave O'Toole as Mick Mulvaney

References

Bibliography
 Low, Rachael. History of the British Film, 1918–1929. George Allen & Unwin, 1971.

1925 films
1925 comedy films
British comedy films
British silent feature films
Films directed by W. P. Kellino
Films shot at Cricklewood Studios
Stoll Pictures films
British black-and-white films
1920s English-language films
1920s British films
Silent comedy films